The Norton–Burnham House, (also known as the Chester Norton House; Daniel Hudson Burnham Birthplace) is a historic house located at 7185 NY 3 in Henderson, Jefferson County, New York.

The limestone house was built by Chester Norton, one of the original settlers of the community. Daniel Burnham, the noted architect, urban planner, and key proponent of the City Beautiful Movement, was born in the house in 1846.

References

Burnham and Root buildings
Houses completed in 1818
Houses in Jefferson County, New York
Houses on the National Register of Historic Places in New York (state)
National Register of Historic Places in Jefferson County, New York
1818 establishments in New York (state)